Kenyon's Department Store is an historic department store building in the village of Wakefield in the town of South Kingstown, Rhode Island.

The historic Chicago style/Queen Anne style store was built in 1891 by Charles Chase and Harry Lewis. Kenyon's Department Store was located in "Wakefield, a village that began when William Kenyon bought  and donated the dirt streets." The original department store business was founded in 1856. The 1891 store building was added to the National Register of Historic Places in 1992. Kenyon's Department Store closed in 1996 when the last descendant retired, and the owner donated the building to South County Hospital to maintain as a medical supply store.

See also
National Register of Historic Places listings in Washington County, Rhode Island

References

Commercial buildings completed in 1891
Commercial buildings on the National Register of Historic Places in Rhode Island
Buildings and structures in South Kingstown, Rhode Island
Department stores on the National Register of Historic Places
National Register of Historic Places in Washington County, Rhode Island
1891 establishments in Rhode Island
Chicago school architecture in the United States